
Garibald (also Gariwald, Garivald, Garioald, Gerbald, Gerwald, Charoald) is a Germanic masculine given name. Garibald was a popular name among the Lombards and Bavarii in the Early Middle Ages, but it is also existed as a personal name among Anglo-Saxons (e.g. West-Saxon "Garbeald"), attested in Searle's Onomasticon Anglo-Saxonicum. Its Lombardic forms are Garipald and Gairipald; in modern Italian it is Garibaldo or Garivaldo (feminine Garibalda), and gives rise to the patronymic Garibaldi, and the adjective garibaldino ("Garibaldian", meaning daring, reckless, bold). Its roots are Proto-Germanic "gairaz", or "gaizaz" (in some West-Germanic dialects "gar" or "ger") (lance, spear) and Proto-Germanic "balthaz" (bold). Today the name is used mainly in Italy, to form an ideological connection with the Risorgimento led by Giuseppe Garibaldi.

Kings of the Lombards
Garibald

Dukes of Trent
Garibald of Trent (died 662)

Dukes of Bavaria
Garibald I of Bavaria (died 591)
Garibald II of Bavaria (died 624/30)

Christian martyrs
Gerbald (died 862)
Gerwald (died 782)

Germanic given names
German masculine given names